Saint-Honoré is a city in Quebec, Canada. It is the seat of Le Fjord-du-Saguenay Regional County Municipality and its most populous municipality.

Economy
The economy of Saint-Honoré is mainly based on agriculture and mining. Niobec is one of the mines located in Saint-Honoré, it is also the only active niobium mine in North America.

Demographics 

Education
Saint-Honoré has two primary schools (Jean Fortin primary school and La Source school) and a Cégep de Chicoutimi campus run by the CQFA, dedicated to teaching aviation. Due to the growing number of families in Saint-Honoré, the provincial government invested $7.1 million to expand the Jean Fortin school. The town also has a municipal library open part-time.

References

External links

Cities and towns in Quebec
Incorporated places in Saguenay–Lac-Saint-Jean